Corston may refer to:

Corston, Somerset, village in the county of Somerset in the United Kingdom
Corston, Wiltshire, village in the county of Wiltshire in the United Kingdom
Baroness Corston (born 1942), British politician, and her review of women in prison (2007)
Tom Corston (born 1949), bishop of Moosonee, Canada